Bozsok (German: Poschendorf) is a village in Vas County, Hungary. It is mentioned in some records from the 13th century. It is near the remains of some Roman water pipes. It lies at the foot of the Kőszeg Mountains on the border with Austria, having Rechnitz on the other side. One of the attractions of Bozsok is Sibrik Castle.

Famous people 
The architect Miklós Hofer was born in Bozsok in 1931.

External links 
 Street map (Hungarian)

References 

Populated places in Vas County